Choquette may refer to:

Choquette (surname)
Choquette (avocado), a commercial avocado cultivar that originated in Florida.
Choquette Hot Springs Provincial Park - A provincial park in British Columbia, Canada
Choquette River, a tributary of the Stikine River in British Columbia, named for Buck Choquette
Choquette Glacier, the source of that river
Mount Choquette, a mountain in the same area